Bernardo Consorti (born c. 1785) was an Italian line-engraver. He was born in Rome. He engraved the Holy Family with Family of St. John after Il Garofalo, the Entombment after Anthony van Dyck, and Psyche  and other sculptures of Antonio Canova.

References

1785 births
Italian engravers
Painters from Rome
Year of death missing